Shoshone is the county seat and largest city of Lincoln County, Idaho, United States. The population was 1,461 at the 2010 census. In contrast to the Shoshone Native American tribe for which it is named, the city's name is correctly pronounced "Show-shown", with a silent "e".

History 
Founded in 1882 during the construction of the Oregon Short Line, Shoshone has long been considered the main railroad station in south central Idaho's Magic Valley region. The much larger community of Twin Falls  to the south never developed a strong railroad presence due to the logistical issues presented by its location south of the Snake River Canyon. For many years, Shoshone was the only Amtrak stop in south central Idaho.

The Union Pacific Railroad opened the Sun Valley resort in 1936 (and owned it until 1964), and its pre-existing  spur route to Ketchum connected here. The spur first headed northeast, following today's  to Richfield and Tikura, then peeled northwest to Picabo and on to Bellevue, Hailey, and Ketchum, so the distance was greater than today's more direct  drive north on 

The caves are lava tubes that stay cool enough for the ice inside them to remain frozen throughout the summer. In the days before refrigeration, this feature, coupled with the railroad, made Shoshone popular with travelers as "the only place for hundreds of miles where one could get a cold beer."

Economy 
Today, Shoshone still has one bar, but also boasts a cafe, a movie theater, and a grocery store—unusual for such a small town. While limited retail jobs exist, Shoshone is primarily a farming and dairy community.

Shoshone is home to a Bureau of Land Management (BLM) facility. The town also has a small medical clinic, and recently built a new K-12 school building.

In recent years, Shoshone has become a bedroom community for workers of neighboring Blaine County, due to a significant difference in cost of living. The resort cities of Ketchum and Sun Valley are about an hour north on Highway 75. This commuting phenomenon has contributed greatly to recent growth in the Shoshone area. Shoshone also has a few historical buildings.

Geography

The Little Wood River runs through the town.

Much of the land around Shoshone is lava rock, which can make excavation for building problematic, and limits the amount of useful farmland.

Climate 
These data below are from the Western Regional Climate Center, compiled over the years 1908 to 2016. Under the Köppen climate classification, Shoshone has a cold semi-arid climate (BSk).

Highways
  - US 26
  - US 93
  - SH-24
  - SH-75 - Sawtooth Scenic Byway

The four highways converge in Shoshone, the southern terminus of SH 75. Traffic between the Magic Valley and Sun Valley passes through Shoshone, maintaining its early heritage as a brief rest stop for travelers.

Demographics

2010 census
As of the census of 2010, there were 1,461 people, 542 households, and 349 families residing in the city. The racial makeup of the city was 81.0% White, 0.1% African American, 0.8% Native American, 0.7% Asian, 0.1% Pacific Islander, 14.5% from other races, and 2.8% from two or more races. Hispanic or Latino of any race were 29.4% of the population.

There were 542 households, of which 38.4% had children under the age of 18 living with them, 48.3% were married couples living together, 10.0% had a female householder with no husband present, 6.1% had a male householder with no wife present, and 35.6% were non-families. 30.3% of all households were made up of individuals, and 13.8% had someone living alone who was 65 years of age or older. The average household size was 2.63 and the average family size was 3.29.

The median age in the city was 33 years. 29.4% of residents were under the age of 18; 8.3% were between the ages of 18 and 24; 24.6% were from 25 to 44; 22.2% were from 45 to 64; and 15.7% were 65 years of age or older. The gender makeup of the city was 48.5% male and 51.5% female.

2000 census
As of the census of 2000, there were 1,398 people, 547 households, and 355 families residing in the city. Apartments are scarce, and most of the neighborhoods are decades old. There has been a small amount of new construction and Shoshone has experienced slow growth since the year 2000, due in part to commuters who work in Sun Valley but choose to live in Shoshone because of the comparatively lower cost of living.

The racial makeup of the city was 88.91% White, 0.07% African American, 1.43% Native American, 0.79% Asian, 0.14% Pacific Islander, 7.65% from other races, and 1.00% from two or more races. Hispanic or Latino of any race were 11.30% of the population.

There were 547 households, out of which 32.4% had children under the age of 18 living with them, 51.0% were married couples living together, 9.0% had a female householder with no husband present, and 35.1% were non-families. 30.0% of all households were made up of individuals, and 14.8% had someone living alone who was 65 years of age or older.  The average household size was 2.49 and the average family size was 3.10.

In the city, the population was spread out, with 27.1% under the age of 18, 8.9% from 18 to 24, 24.8% from 25 to 44, 19.5% from 45 to 64, and 19.6% who were 65 years of age or older.  The median age was 36 years. For every 100 females, there were 94.2 males.  For every 100 females age 18 and over, there were 92.6 males.

The median income for a household in the city was $31,036, and the median income for a family was $35,787. Males had a median income of $29,479 versus $20,417 for females. The per capita income for the city was $14,756.  About 11.1% of families and 13.8% of the population were below the poverty line, including 21.1% of those under age 18 and 7.2% of those age 65 or over.

Notable people 
 Jack M. Murphy (1925-1984) - American politician. Murphy is a former 32nd lieutenant governor of Idaho.
 Tim Ridinger - American politician. Ridinger is a former mayor and member of Idaho House of Representatives.

See also
 List of cities in Idaho

References

External links

 
 Visit Idaho.org - Shoshone Indian Ice Caves
 Historical Information
“States of Mind; Shoshone,” Idaho Public Television, 1991-09-02,  The Walter J. Brown Media Archives & Peabody Awards Collection at the University of Georgia, American Archive of Public Broadcasting

Cities in Lincoln County, Idaho
Cities in Idaho
County seats in Idaho